The Electoral district of Counties of Gloucester, Macquarie, and Stanley and from 1851, Gloucester and Macquarie, was an electorate of the partially elected New South Wales Legislative Council, created for the first elections for the Council in 1843.
The counties of Gloucester and Macquarie were the settled coastal areas north of Northumberland County, while the County of Stanley was the area surrounding Brisbane, in what became part of Queensland after its separation in 1859. Polling took place at Raymond Terrace, Port Macquarie, Dungog, Stroud, Brisbane, Ipswich and Mr Rowley's residence on the Manning River. The County of Stanley was removed from the district with the expansion of the Council in 1851 and became the districts of County of Stanley and Stanley Boroughs.

In 1856 the unicameral Legislative Council was abolished and replaced with an elected Legislative Assembly and an appointed Legislative Council. The district was represented by the Legislative Assembly electorate of Gloucester and Macquarie.

Members

Richard Jones went on to represent Stanley Boroughs from 1851.

Election results
The County of Stanley were around one third of electors, however only 14 voted in 1843. In 1848 neither candidate visited or published any address to the County and the 54 votes were slightly in favour of Colonel Snodgrass. The 1850 by-election was the first in which a resident of the County of Stanley stood for election and the 58 votes from Brisbane were sufficient for Richard Jones to win the election.

1843

Alexander Macleay died on 19 June 1848 however he was not replaced as the Council was dissolved on 30 June 1848.

1848

1850
Snodgrass resigned in September 1850.

1851

See also
Members of the New South Wales Legislative Council, 1843-1851 and 1851-1856

References

Former electoral districts of New South Wales Legislative Council
1843 establishments in Australia
1851 disestablishments in Australia
Electoral districts of New South Wales in the area of Queensland